Orkhony Mönkh-Orgil (born January 30, 1999) is a Mongolian footballer who plays as a defender for Mongolian Premier League club Deren and the Mongolia national team.

International career
Mönkh-Orgil played for the national under-23 team during the 2018 AFC U-23 Championship qualifiers in July 2017.

He made his senior international debut with Mongolia on 5 October 2017 during an international friendly against Chinese Taipei, playing the entire 90 minutes of the 4–2 defeat.

In late 2018, Mönkh-Orgil was called up for the 2019 EAFF E-1 Football Championship qualifiers. He scored his first career goal during their first round fixture against Northern Mariana Islands on 4 September 2018, scoring in the 89th minute of a 9–0 victory. He made two more appearances in the second round in losses against North Korea and Hong Kong, respectively.

Career statistics

International

International goals
Scores and results list Mongolia's goal tally first.

References

External links
 
 
 

Living people
1999 births
Mongolian footballers
Mongolia international footballers
Association football defenders
Deren FC players
Mongolian National Premier League players